Bosman is a Dutch and Afrikaans toponymic surname, originally meaning "man who lives or works in the forest". People with this surname include:

 André Bosman (born 1965), Dutch politician
 Andrea Bosman (born 1979), Dutch bicycle racer
 Andries Bosman (1621–), Flemish priest and flower painter
 (born 1996), Chilean actress
 Charne Bosman (born 1975), South African long-distance runner
 Dick Bosman (born 1944), American baseball player
 Elizabeth Joanna Bosman (1894–1963), South African author
 Fred Bosman (born 1944), Dutch pathologist
 Herman Charles Bosman (1905–1951), South African writer and journalist
 James Bosman, American politician
 Jean-Marc Bosman (born 1964), Belgian footballer
 John Bosman (born 1965), Dutch footballer 
 Len Bosman (1924–2017), Australian politician
 Loots Bosman (born 1977), South African cricketer
 Lourie Bosman (born 1941), South African politician
  (born 1972), Dutch historian and writer
 Melodie Bosman (born 1976), New Zealand rugby union player
 Meyer Bosman (born 1985), South African rugby player
 Patrick Bosman (born 1994), Dutch-born Austrian racing cyclist
 Petrus Bosman (1928–2008), South African ballet dancer and choreographer
  (born 1974), Dutch jazz musician
 Willem Bosman (1672 – after 1703), Dutch merchant living in Ghana

Other
 Bosman ruling, a European Court of Justice decision on association football players' contracts in an action brought by Jean-Marc Bosman
 Bosman Brewery, a Polish brewery
 Bosman language, a language of Papua New Guinea
 Bosman's potto or just potto, after Willem Bosman who described this prosimian in 1703
 "Bosman", Polish and Russian term for some navy Petty Officers after Dutch "bootsman"/German "Bootsmann" (ship's man)
 Bosman Family Vineyards, a South African winery

See also
 Bosmans
 Peter Bossman (born 1955), Ghanaian-born Slovenian doctor and politician

References

Dutch-language surnames
Afrikaans-language surnames
Surnames of Dutch origin
Toponymic surnames